Qabus-nama or Qabus-nameh (variations: Qabusnamah, Qabousnameh, Ghabousnameh, or Ghaboosnameh, in Persian:   or , "Book of Kavus"), Mirror of Princes, is a major work of Persian literature, from the eleventh century (c. 1080 AD).

It was written by Keikavus, the Ziyarid ruler of parts of Tabaristan, and was dedicated to his son Gilanshah.

The belles-lettres was written in 44 chapters and outlines princely education, manners, and conduct in ethical didactic prose.

Extant original copies

 The oldest copy, dated 1349, belongs to the library of Malik National Museum of Iran in Tehran.
 The Egyptian National Library and Archives keeps a copy in Old Anatolian Turkish, written during the reign of Süleyman of Germiyan.
 One of the earliest remaining copies of this work is one dating from 1450, translated into Turkish by Mercimek Ahmed on the orders of the Ottoman Sultan Murad II. It is kept in the Fatih Library of Istanbul.
 The British Museum keeps a copy of an early Turkish translation, dated 1456.
 Another copy, dated 1474, exists in the Bibliothèque nationale de France in Paris (ms. Persan 138).
 An excellent copy is kept at the Leiden University library.

The Turkish version was then translated into German by Heinrich Friedrich von Diez as Buch des Kabus in 1811, and a source of inspiration for Goethe's  West-östlicher Diwan as he was in contact with von Diez.

The text was translated directly from Persian into English by Reuben Levy with the title: A Mirror for Princes in 1951. French, Japanese, Russian, Arabic, and Georgian (1978) language translations also followed.

Cultural references

This work is mentioned several times in Louis L'Amour's The Walking Drum as well as in Tariq Ali's "The Stone Woman".

See also

Persian Literature
Mirrors for princes

Notes

Persian literature
11th-century books
Islamic mirrors for princes